Cephalophyllum subulatoides is a plant species in the family Aizoaceae, endemic to the eastern parts of the Western Cape Province, South Africa.

Description
A compact succulent groundcover, with dark green, acute, triquetrous (triangular in cross-section) leaves, pale-purple flowers, and round fruit capsules that have relatively few locules (c. 12). 

The plants have distinctive short, robust rhizomes, and spread this way into the surrounding area.

Distribution and habitat 
This species is endemic to the eastern parts of the Western Cape Province, South Africa. Its range extends into the Little Karoo, as far west as the Robertson Karoo.

Its ecological preference is shrubby, mountainous fynbos and renosterveld vegetation, usually growing in humus soils.

References

subulatoides
Renosterveld
Taxa named by N. E. Brown
Taxa named by Adrian Hardy Haworth